Emiralem station is a station on the İzmir-Afyon railway just east of Menemen. It is serviced by five train services totaling 10 daily trains. The station was built in 1865 by the Smyrna Cassaba Railway and taken over by the Turkish State Railways in 1934.

External links
 TCDD official site 
 Emiralem station information

References

Railway stations in İzmir Province
Railway stations opened in 1865
1865 establishments in the Ottoman Empire